Maaninkajärvi is a medium-sized lake of Finland. It belongs to the Vuoksi main catchment area. It is located in the Northern Savonia region and in Maaninka municipality. Is it quite a deep lake: in the southern part the mean depth is 24 meters.

See also
List of lakes in Finland

References

Lakes of Kuopio